Gong Maoxin and Li Zhe were the defending champions, but decided not to participate.

Michail Elgin and Alexandre Kudryavtsev won the tournament, defeating Konstantin Kravchuk and Denys Molchanov 3–6, 6–3, [11–9] in the final.

Seeds

Draw

Draw

References
 Main Draw

Karshi Challenger - Doubles
Karshi Challenger